Naameh (also Romanized as Na‘ameh; also known as Naghmeh and Nahmeh) is a village in Chah Varz Rural District, in the Central District of Lamerd County, Fars Province, Iran. At the 2006 census, its population was 174, in 38 families.

References 

Populated places in Lamerd County